Jiří Hrdina (born January 5, 1958) is a Czech former professional ice hockey player. He spent 10 seasons in the Czechoslovak First League with Sparta ČKD Praha and HK Dukla Trenčín and five in the National Hockey League (NHL) with the Calgary Flames and Pittsburgh Penguins.  Of his four full NHL seasons, Hrdina is a three-time Stanley Cup champion, playing on NHL championship teams in 1989, 1991 and 1992.

Internationally, Hrdina was a member of the Czechoslovakian national team between 1977 and 1990. He appeared in two Canada Cups, and played in six World Championships. He was a member of five World Championship medal-winning teams, including a gold medal at the 1985 tournament. He is a two-time Olympian and won a silver medal with the Czechoslovak team at the 1984 Games in Sarajevo.

Playing career

National Hockey League
The Calgary Flames selected Hrdina with their eighth round selection, 159th overall, at the 1984 NHL Entry Draft. However, due to a Czechoslovak policy at the time regarding national team players, he was not permitted to join a professional team until after the 1988 Winter Olympics. Hrdina joined the Flames at the Games' conclusion, and made his NHL debut, as a 30-year-old, on March 3, 1988. He recorded his first point, an assist, in that game, then scored his first NHL goal on March 15 against the Hartford Whalers. He appeared in nine games to end the 1987–88 season with Calgary and scored two goals and seven points.

Hrdina had a four-goal game early in his first full NHL season, 1988–89, leading the Flames to a 6–3 win over the Whalers. On the season, he appeared in 70 games and scored 22 goals to go along with 32 assists. He appeared in only four playoff games that season, but was a member of the Flames' Stanley Cup championship team. Playing as a defensive forward, Hrdina recorded 30 points in 64 games in 1989–90.

In need of an additional centre, the Pittsburgh Penguins acquired Hrdina from the Flames on December 13, 1990, in exchange for defenceman Jim Kyte. The team also hoped he could help their star Czechoslovak rookie Jaromír Jágr, who was struggling to adapt to life in North America. Initially upset at the trade, Hrdina considered retiring or returning to Europe, but chose to give Pittsburgh a try first. He finished the 1990–91 season with 23 points in 51 games combined between the Penguins and Flames, and appeared in 14 more in the 1991 Stanley Cup Playoffs. He scored two goals in the playoffs, both in game seven of Pittsburgh's first round series against the New Jersey Devils, including the game winner. The Penguins went on to win the Stanley Cup.  As a depth player in 1991–92, Hrdina had 16 points in 56 regular season games, and added two assists in 21 playoff games as the Penguins repeated as champions.  He announced his retirement from the NHL following the season. He is currently an amateur scout for the Dallas Stars.

Career statistics

Regular season and playoffs

International

References
Career statistics:

External links

1958 births
Living people
Calgary Flames draft picks
Calgary Flames players
Calgary Flames scouts
Czech ice hockey centres
Dallas Stars scouts
Ice hockey players at the 1984 Winter Olympics
Ice hockey players at the 1988 Winter Olympics
Medalists at the 1984 Winter Olympics
Olympic ice hockey players of Czechoslovakia
Olympic medalists in ice hockey
Olympic silver medalists for Czechoslovakia
Pittsburgh Penguins players
Ice hockey people from Prague
Stanley Cup champions
HC Sparta Praha players
HK Dukla Trenčín players